Pingu is a stop motion children's television series co-created by Otmar Gutmann and Erika Brueggemann, that originally aired in Switzerland, but switched to the United Kingdom in the 2003 revival series. It was originally produced from 1990 to 2000 by Swiss company The Pygos Group (originally called Editoy AG) for SF DRS in Switzerland. It was later revived from 2003 to 2006 for CBeebies by British companies HIT Entertainment and HOT Animation. The series focuses on a family of anthropomorphic emperor penguins who live in the South Pole; the main character is the family's son and title character, Pingu.

The series originally aired for four series from 7 March 1990 to 9 April 2000 on SF DRS. It was then renewed for two more series from 1 August 2003 to 3 March 2006 on CBeebies. Pingu was also nominated for a BAFTA award in 2005. The pilot episode was made on 28 May 1986.

Pingu became popular outside of Switzerland, in part due to its lack of a real spoken language: nearly all dialogue is in an invented grammelot "penguin language" referred to as 'Penguinese', consisting of babbling, muttering and the titular character's characteristic sporadic loud honking noise, which can be popularly recognized as "Noot noot!" or other variants, stated to be "Noo, Noo!" by the defunct Pingu website's trivia page, accompanied by turning his beak into a megaphone-like shape. In the first four series, all the characters were performed by Italian voice actor Carlo Bonomi, using a language of noises that he had already developed and used for the earlier Osvaldo Cavandoli's La Linea. In series 5 and 6, the cast was jointly voiced by David Sant and Marcello Magni.

A Japanese revival of the series, called Pingu in the City, began airing on NHK on 7 October 2017 and ended on 30 March 2019, later in the United Kingdom on ITVBe's children's’ block (known as LittleBe).

Storyline

The programme is set in Antarctica and focuses around penguin families living and working in igloos. The main character, Pingu, belongs to one such family. He frequently goes on adventures with his little sister, Pinga and often gets into mischief with his best friend Robby and his love interest Pingi.

Characters

Main
 Pingu Penguin is the main character of the show, a typically playful, curious little penguin. His name comes from the German word for penguin, . He is stubborn and mostly well-behaved but prone to making mischief and throwing occasional tantrums.
 Pinga Penguin is Pingu's little sister. She resembles an emperor penguin chick, as do other babies/toddler penguins throughout the show. Like all toddlers, she is happy and playful but very sensitive and clever and is often a target for Pingu's pranks.
 Mr. and Mrs. Penguin are Pingu and Pinga's parents; their actual names are not revealed. Father is a postman who uses a non-smoking pipe in the early episodes but quits later. He is a short-tempered but loving penguin and has a motorised sledge (snowmobile) to deliver the mail, sometimes with help from Pingu. Mother is a caring, loving, and hard-working housewife who spends most of her time cooking and cleaning. Mother sometimes gets help from Pingu and Pinga and she always gives them a cuddle when they have learned a lesson.
 Grandfather is Pingu and Pinga's paternal grandfather, who first appeared in the episode "Music Lessons". He is an expert accordionist, as he demonstrates to Pingu in that episode, and is also a former professional weight lifter.
 Grandpa is Pingu and Pinga's maternal grandfather who appeared in "Grandpa is Ill" and "Pingu Cannot Lose", in the latter of which he is shown to be good at bowling.
 Aunts are Mother's sisters and Pingu and Pinga's three maternal aunts. In "Pingu Goes Away", Pingu goes to stay with one of his aunts. In "Pingu the Babysitter", he cares for another aunt's twin chicks whilst she and Mother go out, then in "Pingu Makes a Mistake", he cares for the third aunt's egg, which is due to hatch.
 The Twins are Pingu and Pinga's cousins who appear in "Pingu the Babysitter" where they are cared for by Pingu when their mother (Pingu's aunt) goes out with his Mother.

Recurring
 Robby is a seal who is Pingu's best friend. His name resembles the German word for seal, . First appearing in the episode "Pingu Goes Fishing", he is friendly and playful, yet cheeky in a lot of ways. He is blueish-grey in the first four seasons, but coloured light grey in the last two.
 Pingo is a somewhat foolhardy penguin. He has a long beak that is essentially flat at the bottom but slightly rounded on the top and a head that is wider and taller. He often persuades Pingu to do wild and silly things with him. He was originally a bully in the first episode, but later on, he and Pingg became Pingu's friends.
 Pingg is Pingu's other penguin friend. He also has a long beak, but a shorter head than Pingo. Like Pingo, he was originally a bully, but later on in the series became one of Pingu's friends.
 Pongi is a penguin who wears glasses and has a short round beak. He first appeared in the episode "Ice Hockey".
 Pengy is a penguin very similar to Adélie penguins and first appears in "Pingu and the School Excursion". In the episode "School Time", Pingu resembles Pengy.
 Pingj is a green penguin who appears in Pingu at the Wedding Party; he speaks with an accent that seems to be typical of his breed.
 Punki is a penguin who first appeared in the episode "Pingu Delivers The Mail". He has a tuft on his head and wears striped trousers.
 Bajoo is Pingu's other non-penguin friend. HIT Entertainment reveals him as a "strange newcomer" to the Antarctic in the appearance of a yeti. He was introduced in 2005 and appeared in the last episode, "Pingu & the Abominable Snowman". He also appeared in the 7–11 music video and The Pingu Show.
 Pingi is Pingu's love interest and Pinga's best friend. She has thick, white eyelashes and a somewhat mushed beak. She first appeared in the episode "Pingu's Admirer".

Supporting
 The Schoolmaster (Mr. Peng-Chips) is Pingu's teacher. He lives at the local school and rings the bell when it is time for school to begin or end. He first appeared in the episode "School Time".
 The Doctor is the neighbourhood's doctor. He lives in a nearby igloo clinic and frequently treats Pingu's injuries, as well as aiding in the birth of Pinga.
 Mr. Peng-Hoven is a poor penguin who lives in a tattered igloo and is frequently at the receiving end of Pingu's acts of kindness. He first appeared in "Pingu and the Barrel Organ".

Production history

In 1984, Erika Brueggemann was working at Schweizer Fernsehen when she was introduced to animator Otmar Gutmann. Gutmann pitched a clay animation show starring sea lions who crawled around in a funny way. Erika Brueggemann liked the idea of a clay cartoon character, but she preferred the clay penguins that Gutmann had made. She suggested that the main character should walk upright like a human and asked, "Why not a penguin?"

Brueggemann's colleague, Guido Steiger, agreed with her idea. Otmar Gutmann was not immediately convinced, since he had already created many sea lion characters out of plasticine, but he eventually pushed forward with the penguin idea too. According to Erika Brueggemann, she gave "countless demonstrations on my part about how 'my' penguin had to move and act." From this framework, Brueggemann, Gutmann, and their team created a 7-minute pilot called "Pingu: Eine Geschichte Für Kinder Im Vorschulalter," which was finished in 1986.

The pilot was eventually screened at the 1987 Berlin Film Festival, where it won the Kleiner Baer award. The positive reception to this pilot persuaded the director of Schweizer Fernsehen, Ulrich Kündig, to commission an entire series of the Pingu cartoons.

The first production year from 1988 and starting broadcast with 1990–2000 created 104 five-minute episodes and one special 25-minute episode. The original stories were written by Erika Brueggemann and Guido Steiger, and some of the later stories were written by Silvio Mazzola. These episodes were animated at Trickfilmstudio in Russikon, Switzerland. In the style of voices, a retroscript was chosen, and all voices were performed by Italian voice actor Carlo Bonomi without a script, using a language of noises that he had already developed and used for Osvaldo Cavandoli's La Linea. This feature enables people of diverse linguistic backgrounds to be able to follow the story.

In 1993, David Hasselhoff released a single titled "Pingu Dance", a rap song (in Switzerland only) based on the Pingu shorts and featuring samples of Penguinese. A portion of this song is used as the theme to Pingu in international airings, and was also heard in the re-dubbed version of the "Pingu Looks After the Egg (retitled Pingu Helps with Incubating)" episode, replacing the "Woodpeckers from Space" song from the original version.

A special twenty-five minute episode, Pingu at the Wedding Party, was also produced in 1997, and introduced a family of green penguins.

HIT Entertainment buyout
In October 2001, HIT Entertainment bought the rights to the series, including the original 104 episodes and the wedding special, for £15.9 million. HIT later revived the show, and produced a further 52 episodes in 2003 through 2006. These episodes were animated through stop motion like the original, but used resin casts of the original clay puppets (which had deteriorated by this time).

The HIT Entertainment episodes were made by a completely new team at HOT Animation, but co-creator Erika Brueggemann still traveled to the company's headquarters in the United Kingdom to check on production. At the time, she said, "Last year a production company from England bought everything... I traveled to Manchester last summer and met their highly motivated team who worked with great commitment, humor and responsibility towards children. I think Pingu is in good hands now."

Contrary to some sources, there was never any CGI used in these later episodes. When HIT Entertainment bought the rights, Carlo Bonomi was replaced with new voice actors Marcello Magni and David Sant. Magni and Sant, Italian and Spanish actors based in London, both have a mime and clowning background and were already aware of the clown language of "Grammelot" on which the penguin language was based.

Japanese popularity and Pingu in the City

From its debut in the country in 1992, Pingu became well known in Japan. According to writer Silvio Mazzola in 1996, Pingu was most popular with high-school girls, with over 90% of Japanese girls aged 13–17 knowing about the series. In 2020, an exhibition event commemorating the 40th anniversary of the original "Hugo" animation was held in Tokyo. Pingu currently airs as part of NHK's children's program Nyanchu's World, and also on Cartoon Network Japan. Several pieces of merchandise exclusive to the country has beenn created, including tie in toys with KFC and Mister Donut, as well as various video games.

A Japanese-produced reboot of the series, titled , was announced in 2017. It premiered on NHK-E on October 7, 2017. Unlike its previous series, it is computer-animated, and features Pingu and his family moving to a big city. Each episode involves Pingu attempting to help out anyone there with their jobs, although he usually messes it up. The series was produced by Polygon Pictures in the same style of the original stop motion series through computer animation. It was directed by Naomi Iwata and written by both Kimiko Ueno and Shigenori Tanabe, with music done by Ken Arai. It features voices by Ryota Iwasaki and Fumiya Tanaka, in a similar style to Carlo Bonomi, David Sant and Marcello Magni.

Broadcast history
In the United Kingdom, the BBC aired the original version of Pingu on CBBC when it was a block on BBC1. In 2002, when the BBC created the CBBC channel it was moved to its pre-school channel CBeebies. They used the original cartoon title card (series 1 and 2) from the 52 episodes, and the first 13 episodes of series 3 used the claymation-inspired intro. JimJam contains all of the show's 156 episodes and Pingu at the Wedding Party, but it contains the re-dubbed versions of series 1–2 and contains the original version of Pingu at the Wedding Party, without the titles and credits.

Pingu aired on Nickelodeon in the UK for a period of time in the late 1990s.

According to a 2008 Slate article asking "When will America embrace Pingu?", the series has "been an international sensation for more than two decades while remaining as obscure to American audiences as a Eurovision pop star." The show has only rarely been broadcast in the United States. At first, Pingu was shown on Small World, a showcase of internationally produced shorts that aired during Cartoon Network's Sunday morning lineup from 1996 to 2002. In 2005, the series returned to the country on the new Sprout channel, finally airing as a separate show in the US. It aired on Sprout until it was removed sometime in 2009, and it has not been broadcast since then. Currently, the show is available for streaming on Amazon Prime Instant Video in the US.

A documentary documenting the production and fans of the series, called Pingu - A Cartoon Character who conquers the world, was produced in the early 1990s and follows a detective who tries to figure out why Pingu became popular.

In 2006, Pingu was featured in a music video for Eskimo Disco's first single, "7–11". The music video was also released via CD, on 18 December 2006.

In India, Pingu was aired by Doordarshan in the late 1990s. Since 2000, it has been aired by Cartoon Network,  Hungama TV, and Animax.

In Kenya, Pingu was screened on KBC.

In South Africa, the original series of Pingu began airing on SABC2 and the 2003 series later went onto air on e.tv as part of their children's strand Craz-e!.

In Nigeria, Pingu was being shown on NTA.

In Australia, episodes of Pingu originally aired as a segment on the children's programme, The Book Place on the Seven Network from 1992 to 1996 and later aired on ABC Television as a stand-alone programme in 1998.

In Germany, episodes of Pingu were aired from 10 November 1990 on ZDF, and later on KI.KA.

Pingu was broadcast in the U.A.E. on their English-speaking television network Dubai 33.

Pingu was shown on television for the very first time in Singapore and first aired on Kids Central from 2003 to 2006 and then on Okto from 2012 to 2014.

Pingu aired in New Zealand on TV3 from 1996 to 2006, and on Four beginning in 2011.

Pingu was also aired in Malaysia on TV3, as a part of the morning television program.

In Canada, Pingu airs on TVOKids, CBC Kids, Knowledge Network, Toon-A-Vision, and YTV. Pingu has been a mainstay of the children's programming blocks on TVOntario since the mid-1990s. It can still be seen on TV in that country since APTN airs "The Pingu Show" as part of its morning children's programming block "APTN Kids", and the show is available in English and French language versions. Some of the controversial episodes, such as "Pingu Quarrels With His Mother" (also known as "Pingu Argues With His Mother") and "Little Accidents" (also known as "Pingu's Lavatory Story"), have aired uncut on APTN Kids. In British Columbia, Pingu is aired during commercial breaks on Knowledge Network.

In the United Kingdom, Pingu was featured in the Children In Need 2009 video by Peter Kay, which contained many other popular characters. This was shown on live television across the United Kingdom, and then sold on both CD and DVD. This was Pingu's final appearance for 8 years until Pingu in the City and is also Pingu's final clay animation appearance.

In August 2017, reruns of the fifth and sixth seasons of Pingu started airing in the Milkshake! programming block of the British television channel 5Star. Pingu remained part of the Milkshake! Block for just over a year before being pulled from 5Star and its digital service.

Home video releases

Reception
Pingu received mostly positive reviews, Common Sense Media rated the show a 4 out of 5 stars stating "Parents need to know that this claymation series is funny, endearing, and entertaining. Although the series is appropriate for all ages, the plots might be difficult for the youngest viewers to follow".

References

Notes

Citations

External links
 

 
1986 Swiss television series debuts
1980s Swiss television series
1990s Swiss television series
2000s Swiss television series
2006 Swiss television series endings
1990s preschool education television series
2000s preschool education television series
Animated television series about families
Animated television series about penguins
Animated television series without speech
BBC children's television shows
Censored television series
Children's animated comedy television series
Clay animation television series
Fictional characters introduced in 1986
Fictional penguins
Swiss animated television series
Swiss children's television series
Television series by Mattel Creations
Television series revived after cancellation
Television shows set in Antarctica
Stop-motion animated television series